Vardhman Mahaveer Open University (VMOU), formerly Kota Open University, is an open university in Kota, Rajasthan, India, established in 1987.  VMOU offers courses particularly in the humanities, commerce, library science and informatics. It is geographically distributed throughout Rajasthan, with regional centres in Ajmer, Bikaner, Jaipur, Jodhpur, Kota, Udaipur and Bharatpur, and several tens of study centres in other cities, in addition to a special centre at New Delhi. Ratan Lal Godara was appointed vice chancellor of VMOU in 2019.

References

External links
 

Open universities in India
Universities and colleges in Kota, Rajasthan
Universities in Rajasthan
Educational institutions established in 1987
1987 establishments in Rajasthan
Jain universities and colleges